Fritz Dorls (September 9, 1910 – January 25, 1995) was a far-right German politician and former Nazi Party member. He was chairman of the Nazi-oriented Socialist Reich Party, which was banned by the German Federal Constitutional Court in 1952.

Early life and pre-war period 
After studying history and earning his doctorate degree, Dorls worked as a farmer and forester on his father's estate. On July 1, 1929 he joined the Nazi Party (membership number 141,822). He was also a member of the Sturmabteilung.

Post-military period 
Even though his military service had ended in 1945, World War II was still ongoing. Starting in March 1945, He taught history classes at the German Labor Front Reich School in Erwitte. In May 1945, after the war had ended, he was taken into custody and then interned by the British.

Founding of the Socialist Reich Party 
When Dorls was released from the British internment camp in 1946, Dorls became a member of the German Reich party and quickly became an editor of the party newspaper in 1947. In the spring of 1949, together with Justus Krause, Gerhard Krüger, Joachim von Ostau and Franz Richter (alias Fritz Rössler), he founded the Community of Independent Germans, which formed an electoral alliance with the German Reich Party in Lower Saxony for the federal elections and thus entered the German Bundestag. Dorls also became a member of parliament. After the election, the Community of Independent Germans also joined the German Reich Party organizationally. On 2 October 1949, Dorls was expelled from the German Reich Party together with Krüger and Otto Ernst Remer, and on the same day he founded the Socialist Reich Party together with Krüger, Remer, Bernhard Gericke, and Wolf Graf von Westarp. However, the party was banned by the German Federal Constitution Court on October 23, 1952.

Life after the SRP ban 
After the SRP was banned by the German government, Dorls fled to Spain to avoid arrest. He died at the age of 84.

References 

1910 births
1995 deaths
People from Brilon
20th-century German politicians
Socialist Reich Party politicians